Stoyan Atsarov (born 26 June 1969) is a Bulgarian former professional footballer who played as a defender.

Career
Atsarov left his mark with Slavia Sofia, making 30 appearances (the most of any "whites"' footballer) and scoring one goal during their seventh championship-winning season, which is (as of 2020) the last time the team has won an A PFG title. In 1992 Atsarov also had a short spell with Levski Sofia, featuring in just one Bulgarian Cup match for the "bluemen".

Honours
Slavia Sofia
Bulgarian League: 1995–96
Bulgarian Cup: 1995–96

References

External links
 Profile at LevskiSofia.info

1969 births
Living people
Association football defenders
Bulgarian footballers
FC Yantra Gabrovo players
PFC Levski Sofia players
PFC Slavia Sofia players
Wuhan Guanggu players
First Professional Football League (Bulgaria) players
People from Gabrovo